Richard Lewis Lloyd Harry (born 30 November 1967 in Sydney, Australia, educated at Scotch College Melbourne and Barker College, Hornsby) is a retired Australian rugby union player.

Harry was a hard-running loosehead prop and an integral part of the Wallabies during a golden era, which included clinching the Bledisloe Cup in 1998 and retaining it for the next three years, World Cup glory in 1999, and Tri Nations triumph in 2000.

Harry's playing career started in the back row as a flanker for Sydney club Eastwood, though he soon realised higher honours would not come if he remained there. He made the switch to the front row of the engine room, dropping to 5th grade in the process to ply his trade. By the end of 1994, he was fast-tracked into the Emerging Wallabies and NSW selection came the following year.

In 1996, he was selected for his international debut for the Wallabies against Wales in Brisbane, and went on to record 37 Test caps over a memorable five-year period. In 2005 he named at number one in an Australian Rugby Union team of the decade.

Harry is now a representative for the International Rugby Player's Association.

His father Philip Harry also served as President of the Australian Rugby Union in the late 1990s.

His son Edward Harry was a member of the premiership winning Woollahra Colleagues Whiddon Cup side in 2020.

References 

Australian rugby union players
Australia international rugby union players
Living people
1967 births
People educated at Scotch College, Melbourne
People educated at Barker College
Rugby union flankers
Rugby union props
Rugby union players from Sydney